Jan Bolt (February 3, 1876 in Groningen – May 7, 1967 in Laren) was a Dutch gymnast who competed in the 1908 Summer Olympics. He was part of the Dutch gymnastics team, which finished seventh in the team event.

References

External links
 

1876 births
1967 deaths
Dutch male artistic gymnasts
Gymnasts at the 1908 Summer Olympics
Olympic gymnasts of the Netherlands
Sportspeople from Groningen (city)